The relationship between Mormonism and Freemasonry began early in the life of Joseph Smith, founder of the Latter Day Saint movement.  Smith's older brother, Hyrum, and possibly his father were Freemasons while the family lived near Palmyra, New York. In the late 1820s, the western New York region was swept with anti-Masonic fervor.

Nevertheless, by the 1840s, Smith and several prominent Latter Day Saints had become Freemasons and founded a Masonic Lodge in Nauvoo, Illinois on March 15, 1842. Soon after joining Freemasonry, Smith introduced the temple endowment ceremony including a number of symbolic elements that were very similar to those in Freemasonry. Smith remained a Freemason until his death; however, later leaders in the movement have distanced themselves from Freemasonry. In modern times, The Church of Jesus Christ of Latter-day Saints (LDS Church) has clarified in its Now You Know series that its members may become Freemasons.

Historical connections 
A significant number of leaders in the early Latter Day Saint movement were Masons prior to their involvement in the movement, including Heber C. Kimball and John C. Bennett.

On 15 October 1841, Abraham Jonas (then the Grand Master of the Grand Lodge AF&AM of Illinois) issued a dispensation empowering a Lodge in Nauvoo and appointed the following individuals to be its officers: George Miller, Esq. as its first Worshipful Master; John Parker as its first Senior Warden; and Lucius Scovil as its first Junior Warden. This dispensation empowered the Masons in Nauvoo to meet as a Lodge. The Lodge met on 29 December 1841 and accepted this dispensation. Officers for the Lodge were then elected and appointed. Bylaws for the Lodge were thereafter penned and adopted.

On 17 February 1842, the Lodge voted to hold off on installing its officers until 15 March; a request was also sent to Grand Master Jonas for him to preside over that Installation, which he accepted. Joseph Smith (who was not yet a Mason) was appointed to serve in a pro-tempore position as Grand Installing Chaplain for this Installation. He and Sidney Rigdon were initiated as Entered Apprentices in the evening after the Installation, thereby became members of the newly-formed Nauvoo lodge; Abraham Jonas presided over that degree ceremony.

It appears that John C. Bennett had a particularly strong influence in the spread of Freemasonry among the Mormons. Within the year, there were over 300 Masons in Nauvoo Lodge, which resulted in Meredith Helm (the then-Grand Master who had succeeded Jonas) to issue dispensations to form two other Lodges in the Spring of 1843. One was called Nye Lodge (named for Rev. Jonathan Nye, who would later become Grand Master of the Grand Encampment of Knights Templar, USA) and Helm Lodge (named for the Grand Master who issued this dispensation).

Soon after this, over 1,500 Mormon men in the city of Nauvoo were practicing Masons.

Smith and Rigdon were raised to the third degree of Master Mason "on sight" by Grand Master Jonas of the Grand Lodge of Illinois. At the time and in the jurisdiction of that Grand Lodge, this meant that Joseph and Sidney could go through the three degree ceremonies in a relatively short time without having to prove their respective proficiencies between each degree. They each were passed to the degree of Fellowcraft on the morning of 16 March 1842 and raised to the degree of Master Mason later that day.

Note that Joseph Smith's journal does not mention the sublime degree on Mar 16, 1842, stating only "Continued with the Lodge".  However, minutes from the Nauvoo lodge on the same day do state, "Joseph Smith applied for the third and sublime degree...he was duly raised..."

On 17 March 1842, the Relief Society was established as an auxiliary group for the female members of the Church. Its structure originally had similarities to that of the Masonic Lodge; however, the Relief Society never had its own degree ceremonies nor did it ever purport to confer degrees of any kind on its members.

Hyrum Smith was not only one of Joseph's older brothers but also succeeded their father as Presiding Patriarch and Cowdery as Assistant President of the Church.

Bodley Lodge No. 1 in Quincy, IL presented concerns that the special dispensation granted to Nauvoo Lodge, U.D., was improper, and on August 11, 1842, the special dispensation was suspended by Grand Master Abraham Jonas until the annual Communication of the Illinois Grand Lodge.  "During the short period covering its activities, this Lodge initiated 286 candidates and raised almost as many. John C. Bennett reports an instance in which 63 persons were elected on a single ballot."  This suspension was later lifted and the Mormon Lodges resumed work although several irregularities in their practice were noted. The irregularities centered on mass balloting (voting on more than one candidate at a time) and not requiring proficiency in each degree before proceeding to the next degree (in many cases, initiates were being passed to the Fellowcraft degree and raised to the Master Mason degree within two days of being initiated as an Entered Apprentice). 

There were 5 Masonic Lodges in Mormon communities by April 27, 1843:

 Nauvoo Lodge, U.D. (Nauvoo, IL)
 Helm Lodge, U.D. (Nauvoo, IL)
 Nye Lodge, U.D. (Nauvoo, IL)
 Rising Sun Lodge No.12 (Montrose, IA)
 Keokuk Lodge, U.D. (Keokuk, IA)

There were eventually 1,492 members of these lodges, but only a total of 414 Masons in all the other Illinois lodges. A resolution passed in the Grand Lodge of Illinois on October 3, 1843 to revoke the charter of Rising Sun Lodge, revoke the dispensations of and refuse to provide charters for the rest of these Lodges for the following reasons: 

Rising Sun Lodge No. 12 

 had not paid its dues to the Grand Lodge
 was doing its Masonic work irregularly (or improperly).

Nauvoo Lodge, U.D.

 was doing its Masonic work irregularly.
 failed to bring its record books to the Grand Lodge for inspection.
 was making men Masons without regard to character.
 was not requiring its candidates to become proficient in one degree before being pushed through another degree.

Helm Lodge, U.D.

 was doing its Masonic work irregularly, particularly by "acting on four petitions in one day".
 was pushing candidates from the first degree to the third within two-day time-periods.
 failed to present their records to the Grand Lodge for inspection.
 had only paid a portion of its dues to the Grand Lodge.

Nye Lodge, U.D.

 had the same problems as Helm Lodge.
 initiated candidates within a day of receiving their petitions (thereby not leaving any time for the petitions to be examined, the petitioner to be investigated, and the Lodge to elect the petitioner to become a candidate for the degrees).

Keokuk Lodge, U.D.

 was doing its Masonic work irregularly.
 had allowed petitions to be received and acted upon "within one lunar month."

Following this resolution, Grand Master Alexander Dunlap later sent a representative of the Grand Lodge to Nauvoo Lodge to revoke its dispensation. According to the records of the Grand Lodge, its representative was "treated with contempt," the Lodge refused to part with its charger, and the Lodge stated that they would continue to do Masonic work. Because of this, a resolution in the Grand Lodge of Illinois passed on October 10, 1844 that withdrew all fellowship with Nauvoo Lodge, Helm Lodge, Nye Lodge, and all members thereof; that the Masons working in these Lodges be considered clandestine (or illegitimate), and that all members thereof be suspended from the privileges of Masonry in Illinois. The Lodge in Keokuk seems not to have been given the courtesy of being properly informed by the Grand Lodge of its charter being revoked or its members suspended following the 1843 resolution: 

The Lodge in Nauvoo continued its activities until April 10, 1845, when Brigham Young and George A. Smith advised Lucius Scovil to suspend the work of the Masons in Nauvoo. Only a few additional meetings were held prior to departure of those who followed Young to the Great Basin in 1846 after the succession crisis.

After arriving to the Great Basin, some Latter-day Saints who were Masons sent requests for dispensations to other Grand Lodge jurisdictions in the hopes of being able to meet regularly as a Lodge. Such requests were sent to the United Grand Lodge of England (UGLE) and to one of the Grand Lodges in Mexico; the UGLE never received the letter, and the Grand Lodge in Mexico denied the request.

Lodges were later established in the Utah Territory by Masons who were not adherents of the LDS Church. Four such Lodges were formed: Rocky Mountain Lodge No. 205 (formed by dispensation by the Grand Lodge of Missouri), Mount Moriah Lodge No. 62 (formed by dispensation by the Grand Lodge of Kansas), Wasatch Lodge, U.D. (formed by dispensation from the Grand Lodge of Montana Territory, now the Grand Lodge of Montana), and Argenta Lodge, U.D. (formed by dispensation by the Grand Lodge of Colorado). Rocky Mountain Lodge was a military Lodge made up of US Army soldiers who had come out to what is now Utah because of Buchanan's Blunder; the Lodge eventually came to an end because of the Civil War, which required that these troops withdraw out of the area; in January 1872, the other three of these Lodges went on to establish the Grand Lodge AF&AM of Utah.

In 1925, the Grand Lodge of Utah adopted a formal ban against members of the LDS Church (including church members who had already become Freemasons under other recognized grand lodge jurisdictions)—no reason was given except that the church was not compatible with polygamy; this ban was lifted in 1984. In 2008, a Latter-day Saint served as the Grand Lodge's first LDS Grand Master; it was estimated that he was the first Latter-day Saint to serve as Grand Master of any jurisdiction in approximately 100 years.

Similarities in symbolism and ritual in the LDS Church

LDS Church temple worship shares a limited commonality of symbols, signs, and vocabulary with Freemasonry, including aprons, tokens, ritualistic raising of the arms, etc. Many of these symbols have been adopted and adapted from Masonry to illustrate the principles taught in the movement. For example, whereas Masons exchange secret tokens to identify fellow Freemasons, the ceremonies of the church teach that these tokens must be given to sentinel angels so that disciples of Jesus Christ may be admitted into the highest kingdom of heaven. The LDS Church's temple garments also bear the symbols adopted and adapted from Masonry: those of the Square and Compass; although the movement has imbued these symbols with religious meaning that wholly differs from the meaning of the symbols as used in Freemasonry. The Square and Compasses were a part of the first Angel Moroni statue, hanging above a horizontal Moroni (which doubled as a weather vane). Additionally, the symbols of the square and compasses exist in other ancient traditions far older than Masonry such as in Christian art and the Chinese legend Fuxi and Nüwa.

However, these similarities are both few and superficial, being limited to pedagogical elements (how things are taught) instead of subject matter (what things are taught), context (in what light things are taught), or purposes (why things are taught); in addition, the context and purposes of the Church's temple endowment ceremony wholly differ from those of the degree ceremonies of Freemasonry.

Brigham Young is quoted as describing the origin of the temple rituals in a fashion that directly relates to the story of Hiram Abiff from Masonic folklore. Although Young changed some of the key Masonic aspects about Abiff to fit better with the view of LDS Church temples, the story is the same:

It is theorized that, when Smith was in Carthage Jail in 1844, after he fired his last round in a small pepper-box pistol, he ran to the window and held up his arms in what may have been a Masonic call of distress, hoping Masons in the contingent would honor this call and not fire on him. It is recorded that he ran towards the open window with uplifted hands, and proclaimed, "O Lord my God." Most people see this as only a plea to God for aid, although others suspect otherwise.

LDS Church Previous Stances and Official policy

After the Saints' failed attempts to obtain charters from England and Mexico, Brigham Young decided not to pursue the goal any further.

Eventually, trade unions that were ritualistic and oath-bound started to come into the Utah Territory that were perceived by the leadership of the Church to be destabilizing the territorial economy. We see an example of this in a letter written by President Wilford Woodruff and his two Counselors, George Q. Cannon and Joseph F. Smith concerning whether members of the Ancient Order of United Workmen could hold temple recommends in the Church:

In 1901, the following circular letter from President Lorenzo Snow and his First Counselor Joseph F. Smith to all Stake Presidencies concerning Church members' desires to join "secret orders":

Snow's outlook on secret societies in general may have been formed from:

 the tense relationships between Nauvoo Lodge, U. D. (in which he was initiated after the Lodge had been suspended) and the Grand Lodge of Illinois.
 the tense relationships between the members of the Church in Utah and the Grand Lodge of Utah.
 the Rock Springs massacre (which had happened only about 15 years prior, in which members of a secret society called the Knights of Labor had killed scores of Chinese immigrants and drove the rest out of Wyoming).
 the 1896 circular from the First Presidency concerning the A. O. U. W. quoted above.

Later policies in the Church against joining secret societies in general had been formed more due to such trade unions and organizations as noted above; however, when the Grand Lodge of Utah lifted its formal ban against members of the Church, the Church removed mention of secret societies from its policies. Since this time, the LDS Church's First Presidency has not made an official statement as to whether Freemasonry in particular is compatible with its membership. Don LeFevre, a past church spokesman  said that the LDS Church and in outdated reference to such policies, "strongly advises its members not to affiliate with organizations that are secret, oath-bound, or would cause them to lose interest in church activities." A more tolerant statement is found in the book Encyclopedia of Mormonism, written by church members, stating, "The philosophy and major tenets of Freemasonry are not fundamentally incompatible with the teaching, theology, and doctrines of the Latter-day Saints. Both emphasize morality, sacrifice, consecration, and service, and both condemn selfishness, sin, and greed. Furthermore, the aim of Masonic ritual is to instruct—to make truth available so that man can follow it."

Today there is no formal obstacle in the Grand Lodge of Utah or in any other grand lodge preventing Latter-day Saints from becoming Freemasons. Exceptions have historically been those grand lodges that employ the Swedish Rite system, which requires a Christian Trinitarian belief of its members; these are located in the Nordic/Scandinavian countries. However, the Danish Order of Freemasons (whose Lodges use the Swedish Rite) is affiliated with two Grand Lodges that do not require its members to subscribe to Christian Trinitarian beliefs: The Ancient Fraternity of Free and Accepted Masons of Denmark and the Saint John's Lodge Association. In Sweden and Finland, one can choose between joining the Swedish Order of Freemasons (which uses the Swedish Rite) or the Grand Lodge of Finland (which does not use the Swedish Rite and which does not have the requirement of Christian Trinitarian belief to join). So, even in some of the countries where the Swedish Rite is employed, there still exist alternate options for Latter-day Saints to become Masons.

In 2019, the LDS Church produced a YouTube video in its Now You Know series entitled "Joseph Smith and Masonry." The video states that "the policy [of whether it is acceptable for members of the Church to become Freemasons] is simple: members of the Church […] are not prohibited from becoming Freemasons. Nor are Masons prohibited from becoming members of the Church. Latter-day Saints believe that good can be found in many places."

Since 1984, there have been many Masons in Utah who are Latter-day Saints and who serve and/or have served in various leadership positions, including Grand Masters, other Grand Officers, and Worshipful Masters. Outside of Utah, there have been many members of the LDS Church who have been Masons continuously since its early days.

20th-century explorations of the issue 

 In 1924, S. H. Goodwin (who served as thirty-eighth Grand Master of the Grand Lodge F&AM of Utah in 1912) wrote Mormonism and Masonry (published by the Grand Lodge of Utah), a work defending the formal ban against members of the Church that was implemented the next year.
 In 1934, Anthony W. Ivins (who served in the First Presidency of the LDS Church from 1921 until his death in 1934) wrote Relationship of Mormonism and Freemasonry, a response to S. H. Goodwin's above-mentioned work; it was published by Deseret News Press.
 In 1947, E. Cecil McGavin (who worked in the Church Historian's Office) wrote Mormonism and Masonry, a response to S. H. Goodwin's above-mentioned work; it was published by Bookcraft Publishers.
 In 1989, Robin L Carr (a Freemason but not a Mormon) wrote Freemasonry and Nauvoo, which was published by The Masonic Book Club and The Illinois Lodge of Research; this work explores the history of the "Mormon Lodges" that were established in Nauvoo during the early period of the Church.
 In 1992, Michael W. Homer (a Mormon) wrote "'Similarity of Priesthood in Masonry': The Relationship between Freemasonry and Mormonism" for Dialogue: A Journal of Mormon Thought.
 In 1995, Glen A. Cook (a Mormon who later served as the 137th Grand Master of the Grand Lodge F&AM of Utah in 2008) wrote an article called “A Review of Factors Leading to Tension Between the Church of Jesus Christ of Latter-day Saints and Freemasonry,” which was published in Vol. XLVII, No. 4 of The Philalethes Magazine, the official publication of the Philalethes Society, a Masonic research society.
 In 1999, Sir Knight Joseph E. Bennett, KYCH, 33°, FPS wrote a three-part series entitled "Buck and the Mormons", which includes some Masonic history in Nauvoo; it was published in the October, November, and December issues of Knight Templar, an official publication of the Grand Encampment of Knights Templar, USA.

21st-century explorations of the issue

In 2004, Clyde R. Forsberg authored Equal Rites: The Book of Mormon, Masonry, Gender, and American Culture, which was published by Columbia University Press.
In 2005, Greg Kearney, a temple-endowed Mormon who is also a Freemason, gave a presentation of the issue of Mormonism and Freemasonry at the annual conference of the Foundation for Apologetic Information and Research.
In 2005, Sir Knight James A. Marples, 32°, wrote the article "A Tribute to Masonic Brother Hyrum Smith … A True Nauvoo Mason," which includes some history of Masonry in Nauvoo, in that year's September issue of Knight Templar, an official publication of the Grand Encampment of Knights Templar, USA.
In 2006, Gilbert W. Scharffs wrote Mormons and Masons: Setting the Record Straight, which was published by Millennial Press.
Sometime during the years that the podcast Mormon Expression was active (2009-2014), there were a handful of episodes where a Mormon Mason under the pseudonym George Miller (after the Charter Master of Nauvoo Lodge) was interviewed concerning the history and relationship between Freemasonry and the LDS Church.
In 2009, Matthew B. Brown wrote Exploring the Connection Between Mormons and Masons, which was published by Covenant Communications, Inc. 
In 2010, Kerry Shirts (a founder and former director of research of FAIR), a former believer of the LDS Church, and a Mason released a series of videos on his YouTube channel TheBackyardProfessor, both analyzing Brown's above-mentioned book and expounding on the general issue.
In 2012, Mark Koltko-Rivera (a Freemason and a Mormon) gave a presentation called "Of Masons and Mormons: The Relationship Between Freemasonry's Rituals of Initiation and the Latter-day Saint Temple Ceremonies" at a conference of the Worldwide Exemplification of Freemasonry (a project started by the Grand Lodge of Indiana and the Dwight L. Smith Lodge of Research).
In 2012, a Mormon Mason under the pseudonym George Miller (the same who gave interviews on Mormon Expression mentioned above) also spoke on the matter of Freemasonry and the LDS Church on FMH Podcast.
In 2014, the Joseph Smith Foundation produced the documentary Statesmen & Symbols: Prelude to the Restoration exploring Joseph Smith's involvement in Freemasonry. The DVD also details connections with Masonic symbols among the Chinese, Hopewell Indians, Early Christians, American Founding Fathers and the Egyptians.
In 2014, Michael W. Homer published Joseph's Temples: The Dynamic Relationship Between Freemasonry and Mormonism, a condensation of the last 40 years of scholarship on the issue.
In 2015, Jeffrey M. Bradshaw published a 78-page article entitled "Freemasonry and the Origins of Modern Temple Ordinances" in which he discusses how Freemasonry in Nauvoo helped prepare the Saints for the temple endowment — both familiarizing them with elements they would later encounter in the Nauvoo temple and providing a blessing to them in its own right. He also discusses evidence that the most significant features of modern temple-related doctrines and practices of the movement were already known to Joseph Smith by 1836, and provides a summary of resemblances between modern temple work and ancient ritual practices that pre-date Masonry.
Since at least 2017, the Grand Lodge of British Columbia and Yukon AF&AM have had a section of their online library dedicated to the relationship between Freemasonry and the LDS Church.
In 2019, the LDS Church published an essay entitled "Masonry" as a part of its Church History Topics series.
In 2019, Latter-day Saint History (a YouTube channel operated by the LDS Church) released a brief video called "Freemasonry and Relief Society in Nauvoo" wherein historians Christian Heimburger and Alex D. Smith discuss the effect that Freemasonry had in the formation of the Relief Society of the LDS Church.
In 2020, Saints Unscripted (a YouTube channel that explores issues concerning the LDS Church) released a video called "FREEMASON and MORMON?! | With Brandon Cole" in which a host of the channel interviewed Brandon Cole (a temple-endowed Mormon and a Freemason) concerning Freemasonry and its similarities with the LDS Church.
In 2022, Jason Smith (a former member of the LDS Church and a Freemason) gave a presentation on Sapere Aude (a YouTube channel geared towards Masonic education) entitled "Sapere Aude 282 - Freemasonry and Mormonism by Bro. Jason R. Smith" concerning Freemasonry, its general history, and its shared history/similarities with the LDS Church. A short while later, Mormon Book Review (a YouTube channel that explores issues concerning Mormonism) released a video called "A Freemason Talks About Mormonism and Masonic Connections! w/Jason Smith" in which the host of the channel interviewed Smith concerning the subject.
In 2022, Method Infinite: Freemasonry and the Mormon Restoration, authored by Cheryl L. Bruno (a member of the LDS Church), Joe Steve Swick III (a member of the LDS Church and a Freemason), and Nicholas S. Literski (a Freemason and a former member of the LDS Church), was made available by Greg Kofford Books after at least thirteen years of anticipated release.
In 2022, Freemasonry and the Origins of Latter-day Saint Temple Ordinances, authored by Jeffrey M. Bradshaw, was published.

See also

 Christian attitudes towards Freemasonry
 Walker Lewis
 Master Mahan
 Salt Lake Masonic Temple
 Secret combination (Latter Day Saints)

Citations

Cited and general references

.
.
.
.
.
.
.
.
.
 .
 .
.
.
.
.
.

Further reading
. Online reprint at shields-research.org.
 

 
Freemasonry-related controversies
Latter Day Saint movement in the United States